Erna Schilling (1884 – 2 October 1945) was a German nightclub dancer and artist's model.

The daughter of a proofreader for a publishing company, she was born in Berlin. When she was eighteen, she left home with her elder sister Gerda; the two became dancers in Berlin nightclubs. There in 1912 she met artist Ernst Ludwig Kirchner. Schilling became his companion and preferred model. Through him, she met other members of the group of artists known as Die Brücke. Schilling was also a model used in paintings by Erich Heckel and Otto Mueller. She made decorations for Kirchner's studio and gave dance performances there. She later looked after the artist's business after he suffered a mental breakdown in 1915.  She moved to Switzerland with him in 1921 and became a Swiss citizen in 1937. Kirchner proposed marriage to her in June 1938. She was known as Frau Erna Kirchner following his suicide later that year.

She died in Davos in 1945.

References

1884 births
1945 deaths
German female dancers
German artists' models
Ernst Ludwig Kirchner